Turing College is the University of Kent's sixth college.

Named in honour of the mathematician and codebreaker Alan Turing, the college's residential accommodations are divided into "Turing Houses" and "Turing Flats". The dining area, "Hut 8", is named after Turing's section at Bletchley Park.

Turing College is unlike the other colleges at the University of Kent in the sense that it is strictly residential and has no academic facilities other then a study space above the dining area.

References

2014 establishments in England
Educational institutions established in 2014
University of Kent
Alan Turing